Emys macrocephala may refer to:

 Big-headed Amazon River turtle, a turtle with the synonym Emys macrocephala
 Malayan snail-eating turtle, a turtle with the synonym Emys macrocephala
 Diamondback terrapin, a turtle with the synonym Emys macrocephala